Polecat is a common name for several species of mustelids. The term is also sometimes applied to the skunk in the southern United States.

Polecat may also refer to:

Places in the United States
 Polecat, Tennessee, an unincorporated community
 Polecat Creek (disambiguation)

Arts and entertainment
 Polecat (band), an American country/bluegrass/rock band
 The Polecats, a 1980s British neo-rockabilly band
 "Polecats", a basic repertoire of 12 typical barbershop songs
 The Polecats, a fictional gang in the 1995 video game Full Throttle

Other uses
 , a Royal Navy brig-sloop
 Lockheed Martin Polecat, an unmanned aerial vehicle
 Bob Poley (born 1955), Canadian football player nicknamed "Pole Cat" or "Polecat"
 Norwest Polecats, a Rugby League club playing out of the NSW Tertiary Student Rugby League competition in Australia

See also
 Camille Armand Jules Marie, Prince de Polignac (1832–1913), French nobleman, French brigadier general and Confederate major-general nicknamed "Prince Polecat"